US Post Office-Whitehall is a historic post office building located at Whitehall in Washington County, New York.   It was designed and built 1937–1938, and is one of a number of post offices in New York State designed by the Office of the Supervising Architect of the Treasury Department under Louis A. Simon.  The building is in the Colonial Revival style and is a modest one story building, three bays wide and clad in red brick.  The interior features a 1939 mural by Axel Horn titled "Settlement of Skenesborough."

It was listed on the National Register of Historic Places in 1989.

References

External links

Whitehall
Colonial Revival architecture in New York (state)
Government buildings completed in 1938
Buildings and structures in Washington County, New York
National Register of Historic Places in Washington County, New York